The Florence Depot at 9000 North 30th Street in the Florence community of Omaha, Nebraska. Originally built in 1887 at 28th and Grebe in downtown Florence, the Depot closed in 1966. It was moved to its present location in 1971, and has been used as a historical railroad museum since 1976.

The depot is operated by the Florence Historical Foundation and features exhibits about the local railroads and the depot's history.  The site also features an 1890 caboose and a flat car.

About
Constructed in 1888 as part of a train line from Omaha to Sioux City, the Florence Depot was used as a commuter station, mail drop off and large cargo such as coal, lumber, stone and ice.

See also
 History of North Omaha, Nebraska

References

External links
 Modern photo of Florence Depot and Museum Information
 Florence Depot. Several photos of the interior and exterior of the Florence Depot Museum.

Landmarks in North Omaha, Nebraska
Former railway stations in Omaha, Nebraska
Former Chicago and North Western Railway stations
Railway stations in the United States opened in 1898
Railway stations closed in 1966
Museums in Omaha, Nebraska
Railroad museums in Nebraska